The 1965–66 NBA Season was the 20th season of the National Basketball Association.  The season ended with the Boston Celtics winning an unprecedented 8th straight NBA Championship, beating the Los Angeles Lakers 4 games to 3 in the 1966 NBA Finals.

Season recap

Leading teams

Sixers 

The season started out looking good for Philadelphia 76ers star Wilt Chamberlain, as he had a full year with his new team after half a season the year before. The Sixers came together behind him and won the NBA East with 55 wins in 80 NBA games, the top record in the league.

Yet again, Chamberlain himself was a dominant force. His 1074 field goals were more than 250 ahead of the next top shooting scorer in the league. His 976 free throws tried were second most in the league, helping his NBA-high scoring average even with all the misses at the foul line. He also led the league in shooting accuracy, rebounds and minutes played. He also was 7th in assists.

Celtics 

One game behind in the East, and the league, were the defending champions, the Boston Celtics. The team again featured seven ten-point scorers in Red Auerbach's balanced juggernaut, plus defender/point guard K.C. Jones. Bill Russell again led the defense from the middle. The much anticipated Boston-Philly matchup was the focus of the league all season.

Also-rans 

After the two contenders, the nine-team NBA also featured two strong also-rans.
The Los Angeles Lakers won 45 of 80 games to capture the West Division of the NBA, which produced no league champion 1959–1970. The Lakers were led by superstar Jerry West, whose 818 field goals made were tied for second most in the NBA. He also tried and made the most free throws in the league as he carried the Laker load, going 840 of 977 for an 86% clip. The Lakers' mediocre center play and more limping from Elgin Baylor held back the club's advancement.

The Cincinnati Royals won 45 games also, but were still stuck in the East Division behind the 76ers and Celtics while the Baltimore Bullets remained in the NBA West. The Royals were led again by Oscar Robertson and Jerry Lucas. Robertson matched West's 818 field goals made while also leading the NBA in assists. Robertson got a few more assists than West because he had Lucas to pass to. The Royals forward averaged 22 points and 21 rebounds per game for the season.
West, Robertson, and Lucas accomplished their feats without the benefit of a three-point line.

Playoffs 

Six of the NBA's nine teams made the playoffs, with the second and third place teams in each division meeting in the first round, and the East and West Division winners getting a first round bye, then meeting the first round winners in the second round.

In the East, Boston got another scare from Cincinnati, who jumped to a 2–1 series lead behind Robertson and Lucas, but the Celtics were able to recover and won the next two games to advance.

In the West, the injury-riddled Baltimore Bullets, led by Don Ohl, were swept by the St. Louis Hawks and player/coach Richie Guerin.

Boston met Philadelphia in the much-watched East Final. Wilt Chamberlain averaged 28 points and 30 rebounds for the series, but the Celtics won four of five games and featured dominant performances from Bill Russell, Sam Jones and John Havlicek all starred. The 114-110 overtime win in Game Four proved the turning point in the matchup. Chamberlain hit 28 of 68 free throws in the series, just a 41% clip.
Los Angeles outlasted St. Louis in the West Final four games to three while Boston rested. The Lakers won three of the first four to set the tone of the series. Baylor had returned to lead a more-balanced cast in support of West.

Finals 

Another Boston-L.A. Finals went the full seven games this time as the Lakers made a real run at the better Boston roster. West and Baylor were more of a high-performance tandem in this series, but Boston's three 20-point scorers had just a little more, winning Game 7 at Boston Garden 95-93. Defense and rebounding had prevailed again and Bill Russell dominated in those categories. Red Auerbach, exhausted from two close series plus the scare from Wilt Chamberlain's Sixers, took his victory cigar to the front office after this year. His 8-straight NBA titles, with 9 in 10 seasons, set an early standard with his many innovations and acquisitions that NBA leaders are still chasing to this day.

Notable occurrences 
 The 1966 NBA All-Star Game was played at the Cincinnati Gardens in Cincinnati, with the East beating the West 137–94. Local hero Adrian Smith of the Royals won the game's MVP award.

Final standings

Eastern Division

Western Division

x – clinched playoff spot

Playoff bracket

Statistics leaders

Note: Prior to the 1969–70 season, league leaders in points, rebounds, and assists were determined by totals rather than averages.

NBA awards

Most Valuable Player: Wilt Chamberlain, Philadelphia 76ers
Rookie of the Year: Rick Barry, San Francisco Warriors
Coach of the Year: Dolph Schayes, Philadelphia 76ers

All-NBA First Team:
F – Rick Barry, San Francisco Warriors
F – Jerry Lucas, Cincinnati Royals
C – Wilt Chamberlain, Philadelphia 76ers
G – Oscar Robertson, Cincinnati Royals
G – Jerry West, Los Angeles Lakers

All-NBA Second Team:
G – Hal Greer, Philadelphia 76ers
G – Sam Jones, Boston Celtics
C – Bill Russell, Boston Celtics
F – Gus Johnson, Baltimore Bullets
F – John Havlicek, Boston Celtics

NBA All-Rookie First Team:
Tom Van Arsdale, Detroit Pistons
Rick Barry, San Francisco Warriors
Dick Van Arsdale, New York Knicks
Billy Cunningham, Philadelphia 76ers
Fred Hetzel, San Francisco Warriors

References
1965–66 NBA Season Summary, basketball-reference.com. Retrieved March 30, 2010.